The Wilsons Promontory Islands Important Bird Area comprises a loose cluster of 19 small, granite islands, with a collective area of 658 ha, scattered around Wilsons Promontory in the state of Victoria, south-eastern Australia.  The three southernmost islands are part of the state of Tasmania.  They are important for their breeding seabirds.

Description
The 16 islands under Victorian jurisdiction are Shellback, Norman, Great Glennie, Dannevig, Citadel and McHugh (all of which are part of Wilsons Promontory Marine Park); Cleft, Kanowna, Anser and Wattle (all within Wilsons Promontory Marine National Park); Rabbit, Rag, Cliffy, Seal and Notch Islands, and Rabbit Rock.  The three islands under Tasmanian jurisdiction are Rodondo and West Moncoeur (both of which are nature reserves), and East Moncoeur.  The islands’ vegetation consists mainly of shrubland and tussock grassland.

Birds
The islands have been identified as an Important Bird Area (IBA) by BirdLife International because they support over 1% of the world populations of short-tailed shearwaters (with over 1.4 million nesting burrows), Pacific gulls (with about 450 breeding pairs) and, possibly, of black-faced cormorants.  The IBA also supports a large population of fairy prions.

References

Important Bird Areas of Victoria (Australia)
Islands of Tasmania
Islands of Victoria (Australia)
Wilsons Promontory
Bass Strait
Important Bird Areas of Tasmania